Daniella "Ella" Matteucci (born August 2, 1993) is a Canadian ice hockey and baseball player, currently playing with the Team Sonnet of the Professional Women's Hockey Players Association (PWHPA). She played ice hockey with the Clarkson Golden Knights women's ice hockey program and the Markham Thunder of the Canadian Women's Hockey League (CWHL). As a member of the Canadian women's national baseball team, she won a silver medal at the 2015 Pan American Games.

Playing career

Hockey
At the 2011 Canada Winter Games, she was the captain of Team British Columbia. Of note, she would help her high school team, the Notre Dame Hounds, capture the 2011 Esso Cup, the premier Canadian championship for midget AAA women’s hockey clubs. The final score was a 4–3 shootout against the St. Albert Slash. Matteucci logged two assists in the game, assisting on a first period goal by Taylor Woods and a goal by Jennifer More in the third period.

She joined the professional hockey team, the Markham Thunder, for the 2018–19 CWHL season, the CWHL's final season before folding in May 2019.

Baseball
In her senior year of high school, she pitched a no-hitter for the Notre Dame Hounds boys’ team; Matteucci was the only girl on the team. At the 2014 Women's Baseball World Cup in Miyazaki, Japan, Matteucci pitched against the Japanese team, allowing seven runs.

Career statistics

NCAA

Awards and honours
 2014 NCAA Frozen Four national championship

Personal
She graduated from Clarkson University in May 2015 with a degree in history and a minor in business.

References

External links

1993 births
Living people
Athol Murray College of Notre Dame alumni
Baseball people from British Columbia
Baseball players at the 2015 Pan American Games
Ice hockey people from British Columbia
Canadian female baseball players
Canadian women's ice hockey defencemen
Clarkson Golden Knights women's ice hockey players
Clarkson University alumni
Medalists at the 2015 Pan American Games
Pan American Games medalists in baseball
Pan American Games silver medalists for Canada
Professional Women's Hockey Players Association players